The Outsider is a 1917 American silent drama film directed by William C. Dowlan. It stars Emmy Wehlen, Herbert Heyes, and Florence Short, and was released on November 5, 1917.

Cast

Preservation status
Prints of The Outsider are held by the Museum of Modern Art (MOMA) and Cinemateket-Svenska Filminstitutet, Stockholm.

References

External links 
 
 
 
 Lantern slide (Wayback Machine)

Films directed by William C. Dowlan
Metro Pictures films
1917 drama films
1917 films
Silent American drama films
American silent feature films
American black-and-white films
Films based on American novels
Films produced by B. A. Rolfe
1910s American films
1910s English-language films
English-language drama films